Almeley railway station was a railway station on the line from Kington to Eardisley in the English county of Herefordshire.

History

Opened on the Kington and Eardisley Railway, operated from the outset by the Great Western Railway, the station closed during the Second World War.

The site today

The station building, which was used for many years as a cattle shed, has recently been converted into a dwellinghouse.  The platform still exists.

References
 Butt, R.V.J. (1995). The Directory of Railway Stations. Sparkford: Patrick Stephens Limited. .
 
 Kington to Eardisley Line

Further reading

External links

Disused railway stations in Herefordshire
Former Great Western Railway stations
Railway stations in Great Britain opened in 1874
Railway stations in Great Britain closed in 1917
Railway stations in Great Britain opened in 1922
Railway stations in Great Britain closed in 1940
1874 establishments in England
1940 disestablishments in England